In entertainment, a virtual band (also called a virtual idol, virtual singer, virtual group, cartoon group, cartoon idol, cartoon singer or cartoon band) is a band or music group whose members are not depicted as corporeal musicians, but animated characters or virtual avatars. The music is recorded (and, in the case of concerts, performed) by real musicians and producers, while any media related to the virtual band, including albums, video clips and the visual component of stage performances, feature the animated line-up; in many cases the virtual band members have been credited as the writers and performers of the songs. Live performances can become rather complex, requiring perfect synchronization between the visual and audio components of the show.

The term virtual band was popularized with Gorillaz in 2000. However, the concept of the virtual band was first demonstrated by Alvin and the Chipmunks in 1958, when their creator, Ross Bagdasarian, accelerated recordings of his own voice to achieve the "chipmunk voice". There have since been numerous virtual bands that have recorded material. Computer animation, traditional animation, and vocal mixing and manipulation are common features.

The term virtual idol originates from Japan, where it dates back to the 1980s and has roots in anime and Japanese idol culture. Popular virtual idols include the Vocaloid singer Hatsune Miku and the virtual YouTuber Kizuna AI.

The term is sometimes confused for music groups who collaborate using the Internet, who do not require members to be in the same physical place for their work.

Members 
The members of virtual groups are depicted as animated characters, with their own personality, voice, history, and playing style. For example, Alvin, the leader of the Chipmunks, is mischievous, and Skeleton Staff's Guitarist Stanton is a party-going underachiever. Furthermore, Freen in Green's bassist Sparky is sluggish, while Murdoc of Gorillaz is a middle-aged satanic bass player. Another example is Hatsune Miku who does not have a definite personality; her personality changes in each song based on interactions from the users of Vocaloid.

The style of animation used for depicting the characters varies. Some groups, like The Archies, Gorillaz, Dethklok, The Banana Splits, Prozzäk, One-T, Dvar and Alvin and the Chipmunks are hand-drawn characters, and much of their media uses traditional animation and cartooning techniques. Others, such as Hatsune Miku, Crazy Frog, Genki Rockets, Gummibär, Pinocchio, The Bots, Studio Killers, and more recently, Beatcats, K/DA, and Hololive are computer-generated.

Some people consider puppetry as a form of animation; this consideration means groups like Dr. Teeth and the Electric Mayhem or 31 Minutes can be considered virtual bands.

Production

In studio 
The recording of the music is done by the human musicians and artists, whom the virtual artists are depicted to emulate. In some cases, the singing is done by machines or synthesizer applications, like the Hatsune Miku vocaloid. This is done using the normal in-studio recording process; see Sound recording for a detailed explanation.

In some instances, most notably The Chipmunks, manipulation of voices may be employed, either to achieve a desired vocal effect, or to make it dissimilar to the voice of the actual singer. The manipulation is done by either modifying the playback speed of the vocal track or by putting it through a synthesizer (Vocoding).

Writing and production credits may be assigned to either the virtual band characters, or the human writers and artists involved.

On stage 
Virtual bands often perform through virtual concerts, where their likenesses are represented digitally on stage. One of two methods can be employed for live performances. The first involves animating the entire set, with little or no allowance for audience interaction, then "performing" it as is. The major pitfall with this method is the lack of audience interaction, which can be vital during concerts. This is best suited to short performances, where audience response can be predicted.

The second, and more complex, method differs from the first in that allowance is made for a variety of responses and interaction. This means having a wide range of animated sequences ready to play, with matching spoken lines, in response to different reactions.

In both cases, extensive rehearsal is required to synchronize spoken lines and instrumentation with animated action. This can be eliminated by using pre-recorded music and speech; however, doing so also weakens the actual "live" experience.

(Some non-virtual artists and groups have employed a similar technique on some concert tours and performances. DJ Shadow, for example, on his In Tune and On Time tour, had pre-animated sequences, which were played on giant screens behind him while he performed the set. Again, a large amount of pre-tour planning and synchronization rehearsal was required beforehand.)

History

Early history 
While the term had not been coined at the time, Alvin and the Chipmunks were the first virtual band to receive widespread fame. Centered on Alvin, his two brothers Simon and Theodore, and their manager/father Dave Seville, their voices were created by Ross Bagdasarian, Sr., who accelerated the recording of his voice to create the distinctive sound; the process earned him two Grammys in 1959 for engineering.

The success of the Chipmunks spurred on another group, the Nutty Squirrels, to join the ranks. A scat-singing version of Bagdasarian's creation, they made the American Top 40 with their song "Uh-Oh". Their success, however, was short-lived.

Television 
In 1968, The Banana Splits premiered on NBC but failed to chart the top 40. A year later in 1969, from rival CBS, The Archies were the first virtual band to appear in worldwide pop charts.

During this time, other television programs, such as Josie and the Pussycats and The Muppet Show, began to include bands as part of the format (in the case of Josie and the Pussycats, the eponymous band was the show's focus). Some of the groups that appeared on these shows released mainstream recordings. Some bands, however, would "break up" after the end of the show's run.

After The Archies, produced by Filmation, became a huge pop hit, Hanna-Barbera started releasing several cartoon TV shows with the adventures of rock bands, such as Josie and the Pussycats, The Cattanooga Cats, The Impossibles, Butch Cassidy and the Sundance Kids, Jabberjaw, and others.

During the 1980s, Hasbro released Jem, an animated TV series featuring two enemy bands with a music video in each episode.

Virtual bands still appear in television: the Chipmunks appeared in their own television show for much of the 1990s, and the Adult Swim show Metalocalypse features the virtual melodic death metal band Dethklok.

Japanese virtual idols 

Virtual idols originate from Japan, with roots in anime and Japanese idol culture, and dating back to the 1980s, starting with the Macross mecha anime franchise (adapted into the Robotech franchise in North America). The first virtual idol was Lynn Minmay, a fictional singer who is one of the main characters in the anime television series Super Dimension Fortress Macross (1982) and the animated film adaptation Macross: Do You Remember Love? (1984). Voiced by Mari Iijima, Lynn Minmay became the first fictional idol singer to garner major real-world success. The theme song "Do You Remember Love?" (from the film Macross: Do You Remember Love?) reached number seven on the Oricon music charts in Japan, and the song has since been covered numerous times over the next several decades.

The Japanese cyberpunk anime Megazone 23 (1985) took the virtual idol concept further with EVE, who is depicted as a computer-based artificial intelligence (AI) who takes the form of a virtual idol within a proto-Matrix-like virtual reality. Megazone 23 was a success in Japan partly due to the appeal of EVE, and it was later adapted into Robotech: The Movie (1986) in North America. A similar concept later appeared in Macross Plus (1994) with the virtual idol Sharon Apple, a computer program who takes the form of an intergalactic pop star. The same year, the fictional Japanese rock band Fire Bomber from Macross 7 (1994) became a commercial success, spawning multiple CDs released in Japan.

The Japanese talent agency Horipro created the first real-life AI virtual idol, Kyoko Date, in 1995. Her creation was inspired by the success of the Macross franchise and dating sim games such as Tokimeki Memorial (1994), along with advances in computer graphics. Her initial announcement drew headlines, both in Japan and internationally, before she debuted as a CGI idol in 1996. However, she failed to gain commercial success, largely due to technical limitations leading to issues such as unnatural movement (an issue known as the uncanny valley). Despite her failure, she provided the template for later virtual idols who gained commercial success in the early 21st century, such as the Vocaloid singer Hatsune Miku and the virtual YouTuber Kizuna AI.

In 2007, Crypton Future Media and Yamaha launched Vocaloid 2, with the voice bank of Hatsune Miku. In 2009, Hatsune Miku had her first concert. Other Vocaloids include Meiko, Kaito, Kagamine Rin and Len, and Megurine Luka.

Virtual bands can also originate from video games, as proven by the 2015 Wii U game Splatoon, which features songs credited to various virtual bands, the most notable being a pop duo called the Squid Sisters, who have performed several real world concerts as holograms. The game's 2017 Nintendo Switch sequel, Splatoon 2, introduces more virtual bands, most notably Off the Hook, a duo similar to the Squid Sisters. The two duos have performed together as holograms, and has had a special guest, K.K. Slider from the Animal Crossing series, to celebrate the release of Animal Crossing New Horizons.  Prior to it, Nintendo had already made a virtual band composed of characters from Pikmin called Strawberry Flower, to promote the games. Their first single, Ai no Uta, was a massive success in Japan, reaching #2 on the Weekly Oricon Top 200 Singles chart. In 2020, Sega and Sanrio teamed up to make their first collaboration virtual band, Beatcats.

Western virtual bands 

Britain's Gorillaz was formed by Blur's Damon Albarn and Tank Girls Jamie Hewlett in 1998 and produced by Deltron 3030's Dan the Automator. The group brought virtual bands to the musical fore again, with their scoring numerous Top 20 positions around the world. The band has since released seven studio albums in addition to two B-sides albums and two EPs.

One-T was a similar French virtual band concept created by Eddy Gronfier and Thomas Pieds that centred around a fictional animated hip-hop group. It saw brief success in the early 2000s with the hit singles Music Is the One-T ODC and The Magic Key but since then only showed little activity.

Dethklok is an animated heavy metal band that originates from the Adult Swim animated television series Metalocalypse. They have released three albums so far.

Dvar was an anonymous darkwave virtual band from Russia that existed from 1995 to 2012. Consisted of three virtual unnamed characters

Elite Tauren Chieftain is a virtual hard-rock band of five members in World of Warcraft Universe composed of Blizzard Entertainment employees in 2003 (Samwise Didier, Chris Sigaty, Dave Berggren, Mike Morhaime, and Alan Dabiri).

Pentakill is a virtual heavy metal band consisting of six themed versions of League of Legends characters revealed in 2014.

Pentakill was followed by K/DA, a virtual K-pop girl group consisting of four themed versions of characters, which unveiled at the 2018 League of Legends World Championship with an augmented reality-based live performance of their first song, "Pop/Stars". After a two-year hiatus, the virtual group released a second single, "The Baddest". The group appeared on stage at the 2020 League of Legends World Championship to promote an EP "All Out" which was released in November 2020.

In 2019, Riot created a virtual hip hop group called True Damage, featuring the champions Ekko, Akali, Qiyana, Senna, and Yasuo. The vocalists performed a live version of their debut song, "Giants", during the opening ceremony of the 2019 League of Legends World Championship, alongside holographic versions of their characters.

See also
 Avatar (computing)
 Uncanny valley
 Virtual actor
 Virtual concert
 Virtual influencer
 Virtual YouTuber

References